Wang Youping (1910–1995) was a Chinese diplomat. He was a veteran of the Second Sino-Japanese War and the Chinese Civil War. He was Ambassador of the People's Republic of China to Romania (1950–1954), Norway (1955–1958), Cambodia (1958–1961), Cuba (1964–1969), North Vietnam (1969–1974), Malaysia (1975–1977) and the Soviet Union (1977–1979).

1910 births
1995 deaths
Politicians from Zibo
Chinese Communist Party politicians from Shandong
People's Republic of China politicians from Shandong
Ambassadors of China to Romania
Ambassadors of China to Norway
Ambassadors of China to Cambodia
Ambassadors of China to Cuba
Ambassadors of China to Vietnam
Ambassadors of China to Malaysia
Ambassadors of China to the Soviet Union
Members of the Central Advisory Commission
Diplomats of the People's Republic of China
Delegates to the 3rd National People's Congress
Delegates to the 5th National People's Congress
Chinese people of World War II
People of the Chinese Civil War